K. V. Ramakrishna Reddy was an Indian politician. He was a Member of Parliament, representing Hindupur, Andhra Pradesh in the Lok Sabha the lower house of India's Parliament as a member of the Indian National Congress.

References

External links
 Official biographical sketch in Parliament of India website

Lok Sabha members from Andhra Pradesh
Indian National Congress politicians
1907 births
India MPs 1957–1962
India MPs 1962–1967
Year of death missing